Viacheslav Sergeyevich Tilicheev (born 17 July 1994) is a Russian chess player and former chess prodigy. He was awarded the title of Grandmaster in February 2020. His peak classical rating is 2540.

In 2020, Tilicheev won the 42nd Georgi Tringov Memorial on tie-break from Martin Petrov, Tsvetan Stoyanov, and Beloslava Krasteva.

Notable games
Victory against Vladislav Artemiev: Tilicheev vs Artemiev, European Rapid (2018), Grünfeld Defence (D91), 1-0
Victory against Evgeny Gleizerov: Gleizerov vs Tilicheev, Cyprus International Open (2019), Benoni Defense (A62), 0-1

References

External links
Viacheslav Tilicheev chess games at 365Chess.com

Viacheslav Tilicheev team chess record at Olimpbase.org

1994 births
Living people
Chess grandmasters
Russian chess players
Musicians from Krasnoyarsk